Danny Blume  is an American music producer, musician, and composer. He is a Grammy Award winner and multiple Grammy nominee. He operates a studio and lives in Woodstock, New York. Before becoming a music producer, he played as a guitarist and bassist for Kid Creole and the Coconuts, playing for multiple U.S Presidents. In the 2018 Grammy's he was nominated for Best Children's Album for his work as a producer with Falu as engineer and producer.

External links 
 http://www.dannyblume.com

1960 births
Living people
Musicians from Berkeley, California
Record producers from California
American male composers
21st-century American composers
American audio engineers
Grammy Award winners
Engineers from California
21st-century American male musicians
The Lounge Lizards members